Ts Madison Hinton (born October 22, 1977), also known as Maddie, is an American reality television personality, actress, and LGBT activist. With the reality show The Ts Madison Experience, she became the first black trans woman to star in and executive produce her own reality series. She has appeared in films such as Zola and Bros and has been a member of the regular judging panel on RuPaul's Drag Race since the show's fifteenth season following several previous appearances as a guest judge.

Biography
Madison rose to fame in 2013 after going viral following the release of a Vine clip titled "New Weave 22 Inches". The video features her exposing her nude body. During this time, Madison was starring in adult films and running a successful production company. On the LGBTQ&A podcast, Madison said she started doing sex work after being fired from multiple jobs for being trans. "I was hell-bent on me not being broke anymore in life. Me not having to worry about where I'm going to live, how I'm going to pay my bills, because I came from that time of me having to really worry. And this was a place of security for me."

After becoming a viral sensation, Madison signed a recording and media contract with Pink Money Records in 2014 and released her first single "Feeling My Fish" shortly after. In 2016, Madison released her debut album, The New Supreme, and appeared with Ellis Miah and RuPaul on the song, "Drop". In 2021, she collaborated with Todrick Hall on the song, "DICK THIS BIG".

With World of Wonder, she starred in two web series, Wait a Minute and Lemme Pick You Up.

In 2015, she released her memoir, A Light Through the Shade: An Autobiography of a Queen.

Madison has had roles in the movie Zola, and the upcoming romantic comedy, The Perfect Find, on Netflix. Janicza Bravo, the director of Zola, told The New York Times that she discovered Madison through her viral Vine video, watching it "maybe 20 times in a row...I became kind of obsessed with her." Madison appeared in Bros, "the first gay romantic comedy from a major studio". According to The Hollywood Reporter, the movie has a "historic all-LGBTQ principal cast".

Madison has made multiple appearances as a guest judge on RuPaul's Drag Race. In 2019, Silky Nutmeg Ganache played Madison in the Snatch Game episode of RuPaul's Drag Race season 11 and won the episode.

In 2021, The Ts Madison Experience debuted on We TV, making Madison the first black trans woman to star in her own reality show. Madison was also an executive producer on the series. On February 2021, Madison shared on a Facebook panel her experiences and knowledge on erasure of Black trans love. In 2022, WE tv announced that The Ts Madison Experience had been renewed for a second season.

Madison's voice is sampled on the song "Cozy" on Beyoncé's 2022 album Renaissance.

Works

Film
 Trans-Me (2017), written by B. Octavious Sims and produced by SimGriggs Productions, directed by Sims and Gregory Griggs
 Zola (2020) - Hollywood
 Bros (2022) - Angela
 The Perfect Find - TBA, Gabrielle Union-led project

Television
 RuPaul's Drag Race, guest judge (seasons thirteen and fourteen), regular judge (season fifteen)
 Amazon Prime Video's Fish Tank (2018), co-starred with Isis King and Arisce Wanzer
The Ts Madison Experience (2021)
Turnt Out with TS Madison on Fox Soul (2022)
Hush (2022) - Mona Dee

Streaming television
 Wait a Minute through World of Wonder Productions
 Lemme Pick You Up through World of Wonder Productions
 Queens Supreme Court (2018), previously Queens Court
 Bish Let's Dish (Bae Edition)
 Beyond The Bench (2019)
 Cracking The Cold Cases w/ Ts Madison (2019)
 Song Association w/ Ts Madison (2019)
 Fuse Tv (The Read) w/ Ts Madison (2019)
 BUILD Series, The X Change Rate: Ts Madison (2019)
 A Spotlight Session w/ Ts Madison (2020)
 Bring Back My Girls (2022–present)
 Pierre's Panic Room (2020–present), hosted by Pierre Edwards

Music
 The New Supreme (2014), released on Pink Money Records
 RuPaul’s Butch Queen, Drop feat. Ts Madison (2016)
 The Queens Supreme Court Theme Song (2018)
 Pop That Ass (2020)
Khia's Next Caller, feat. Ts Madison (2017)
Rigel Gemini's Coffee In My Cup - Music Video (2021)

Books
 A Light Through the Shade: An Autobiography of a Queen (2015), published by CreateSpace

Podcasting
 Queens Supreme Court (2018), previously Queens Court
 Laugh & Learn (2021), Special Guest; greeted by host Flame Monroe, a transgender comedian
 Pierre's Panic Room (2020–present), Guest; hosted by Pierre Edwards

Radio
Madison has guest starred a number of times on Nicki Minaj's Queen Radio show, which aired on Beats 1.

Awards
Madison was presented with a Lifetime Achievement Award at the 2016 Transgender Erotica Awards hosted by Grooby, and received a standing ovation. In 2019, she was honored in the Out magazine Top 100 influential LGBT people. In 2022 she won the WOWIE Award for Best Viral Moment. In 2022, Madison and Dominique Morgan were chosen as the Grand Marshals of the NYC Pride Parade.

References

External links
 
 
 Ts Madison at Rotten Tomatoes
 Ts Madison at TV Guide

African-American pornographic film actors
Living people
Transgender pornographic film actresses
LGBT people from Florida
LGBT African Americans
1977 births
LGBT media personalities
Transgender actresses
People from Miami
Transgender Erotica Award winners
Transgender erotica
21st-century African-American people
20th-century African-American people
American LGBT rights activists
Activists from Florida
American television producers
Participants in American reality television series
LGBT rappers